Yate Town Football Club is a football club based in Yate, Gloucestershire, England.

History
The club was established in 1906 under the name Yate Rovers. They won the Gloucestershire Junior Cup in 1913–14, but disbanded in the early 1930s. After reforming under the name Yate YMCA in 1933, they joined the Bristol & District League. The club were Division Five champions in 1947–48 and were promoted to Division Three. In 1954–55 they were Division Two runners-up, earning promotion to Division One. In the mid-1960s the club moved up to the Bristol Premier Combination.

In 1968 Yate were founder members of the Gloucestershire County League, and the following year they were renamed Yate Town. In 1983 the club transferred to Division One of the Hellenic League. They were Division One runners-up in 1984–85, earning promotion to the Premier Division. The club went on to win back-to-back Premier Division titles in 1987–88 and 1988–89, also winning the Gloucestershire Challenge Trophy in the latter season. Following their second league title, they moved up to the Southern Division of the Southern League.

After two seasons in the Southern Division, Yate were transferred to the Midland Division, where the club played until returning to the Southern Division in 1994. In 1997–98 they finished bottom of the division, but were not relegated due to league restructuring. The division was renamed the Western Division in 1999, and the club finished bottom of the division in 1999–2000, resulting in relegation and a return to the Premier Division of the Hellenic League. In 2002–03 they were Premier Division runners-up, earning promotion back to the Southern League's Western Division.

In 2004–05 Yate were Western Division runners-up and were promoted to the Premier Division. They also won the Gloucestershire Senior Cup, an went on to retain the trophy the following season. The club remained in the Premier Division for four seasons, until being relegated to the renamed Division One South & West at the end of the 2008–09 season. They won the Senior Cup again in 2010–11. In 2012–13 the club reached the first round of the FA Cup for the first time, losing 3–0 at Cheltenham Town. Division One South & West was renamed the Division One West in 2017, and then Division One South the following year. A third-place finish in 2018–19 saw them qualify for the promotion play-offs. After beating Moneyfields on penalties in the semi-final, they defeated Cinderford Town 3–1 in the final to secure promotion to the Premier Division South.

The 2021–22 season saw Yate reach the first round of the FA Cup again, losing 5–0 at home to Yeovil Town. They also won the Gloucestershire Senior Cup, defeating Cirencester Town 5–1 in the final.

Ground
The club played at Yate Aerodrome between 1954 and 1960, and then Sunnyside Lane from 1960 until 1984. They then moved to Lodge Road, where a 236-seat stand was built in 1987 and floodlights installed the following year.

Coaching staff
First Team Manager: John Rendell
Assistant Manager: Paul Tovey
First Team Coach: Dan Gillespie
Goalkeeping Coach: Rhys Evans
Kit Manager: Gary Webb, James Hicks
Sports Therapist: Jonny Evans

Honours
Hellenic League
Premier Division champions 1987–88, 1988–89
Bristol & District League
Division Five champions 1947–48
Gloucestershire Senior Cup
Winners 2004–05, 2005–06, 2010–11, 2021–22
Gloucestershire Challenge Trophy
Winners 1988–89
Gloucestershire Junior Cup
Winners 1913–14

Records
Best FA Cup performance: First round, 2012–13, 2021–22
Best FA Trophy performance: Third round, 2004–05
Best FA Vase performance: Fifth round, 1991–92
Biggest win: 13–3 vs Clevedon, Bristol Premier Combination, 1967–68
Most appearances: Gary Hewlett
Most goals: Kevin Thaws
Record attendance: 2,000 vs Bristol Rovers XI, testimonial match, 1990
Record transfer fee received: £15,000 from Bristol Rovers for Mike Davis
Record transfer fee paid: £2,000 to Chippenham Town for Matt Rawlings, 2003

See also
Yate Town F.C. players
Yate Town F.C. managers

References

External links
Official website

 
Football clubs in England
Football clubs in Gloucestershire
Association football clubs established in 1906
1906 establishments in England
Bristol and District Football League
Bristol Premier Combination
Gloucestershire County Football League
Hellenic Football League
Southern Football League clubs